Sint-Katelijne-Waver (old spelling: Kathelijne-Waver;) is a municipality located in the Belgian province of Antwerp. The municipality comprises the towns of Onze-Lieve-Vrouw-Waver and Sint-Katelijne-Waver proper. In 2021, Sint-Katelijne-Waver had a total population of 21,197. The total area is 36.12 km2. Roosendael, a ruined relic of a cistercian abbey is situated here and today hosts a youth and touristic centre with pleasant walkways.

Economic activities
Sint-Katelijne-Waver is a centre for market gardening and has many greenhouses. The Mechelse Veilingen in Sint-Katelijne-Waver is the largest co-operative vegetable auction in Europe.

Pictures

Notable people

References

External links

Official website - Available only in Dutch

Municipalities of Antwerp Province
Populated places in Antwerp Province